DMAX is a men's lifestyle channel operated by Warner Bros. Discovery EMEA, a division of Warner Bros. Discovery International owned by Warner Bros. Discovery.

It broadcasts free-to-air in Germany, Austria, Switzerland, Asia-Pacific, United Kingdom, Ireland, Italy and Spain; Turkey has their own version of the channel too. It is also widely available throughout the rest of Europe. It is seen as the only free-to-air mainstream channel with a focus on non-fiction entertainment, unique in German media.

DMAX broadcasts from the Astra 1H, 1L, and 3A satellites and is uplinked by SES Platform Services (later MX1, now part of SES Video).

XXP origins
DMAX is the Discovery Communications creation from the originally German sourced and owned station XXP. Discovery purchased XXP on 1 January 2006. DMAX was launched as a free-to-air channel from 1 September, targeted at men.
Its name was invented by Discovery Creative Director James Gilbey who asked design agencies to submit names in an innovative competition. RedBee based in London were the winning agency.
Its most recent rebrand was created by Artillery Design Ltd based in Brighton UK.
DMAX focuses on men's hobbies, and its range of programmes is aimed at men looking for more than the current offer of sports and news programmes. DMAX involves a mix of adventure and discovery, cars and technology, popular science, DIY and travel. DMAX does not include football or erotic programmes.
Patrick Hörl is managing director, while Katja Hofem-Best, who comes from RTL II, is CEO.

Additional DMAX channels 
In Spain, DMAX was launched on 12 January 2012 as Discovery MAX, and renamed in September 2016. With the success of the German speaking DMAX a separate channel was launched for the UK and Ireland markets on 22 November 2007. DMAX was launched in Italy on 12 December 2011, and now is the ninth most watched channel of the country. In the Asia-Pacific market, DMAX launched on 7 July 2014 replacing Discovery Turbo (Asia). In the Turkey market, DMAX launched on 18 March 2018 replacing NTV Spor after Doğuş Media Group's NTV Spor channel was acquired by Discovery, since February.

Some programmes shown on DMAX
Was geht? Experiment am Limit ('What works? Experiments at the limits') – answers questions like 'can a gun be fired underwater?'
Die Ludolfs – 4 Brüder auf'm Schrottplatz (The Ludolfs – 4 brothers at the scrapyard) – observes Peter, Manni, Uwe and Günther eating pasta and fiddling around on broken cars
D Tech – Presenter Daniel Hartwich takes viewers on an entertaining journey through the world of knowledge.
Fish 'n' Fun –beautiful landscape shots, fishing tricks and shows men how to make delicious dishes using the fish they catch. The male desire for adventure is also satisfied, for example with the documentary series on crab fishers in Alaskan waters
D Motor – presented by Tim Schrick and Sabine Schmitz, who has to prove her own driving skill against an opponent on her local race track, the Nürburgring
Moneycoach – Rette dein Geld (Money coach – save your money) – presenter Michael Requardt helps viewers with debt problems

The channel also features many Discovery Communications programs, including:

Jack Osbourne: Adrenaline Junkie – a British reality series focusing on Jack Osbourne's globe-trekking six-month quest to get in physical and mental shape to climb the rockface of California's El Capitan mountain
Knight Rider (1982 TV series) – an American television series created and produced by Glen A. Larson. The series was originally broadcast on NBC from 1982 to 1986. The show stars David Hasselhoff as Michael Knight, a high-tech modern crime fighter assisted by KITT, an advanced artificially intelligent and nearly indestructible car. This was the last series Larson devised at Universal Television before he moved to 20th Century Fox.
Long Way Round – documentary television series of the 19,000-mile journey of Ewan McGregor and Charley Boorman from London to New York on motorcycles. They travelled eastwards through Europe and Asia, flew to Alaska and continued by road from there to New York.
Magnum, P.I. – drama series starring Tom Selleck as Thomas Magnum, a successful private investigator. Episodes broadcast are edited.
and
30 Days – with Morgan Spurlock
An Idiot Abroad – with Karl Pilkington, Ricky Gervais, Stephen Merchant and Warwick Davis
American Chopper – with Paul Teutul Jr. and Paul Teutul Sr.
Auction Hunters (Auction Hunters – Zwei Asse machen Kasse) (2012–present)
Auction Kings (2013–present)
Austin Stevens: Snakemaster (Austin Stevens – Der Gefahrensucher) (2006)
Battleground: Rhino Wars (Rhino Wars – Kampf den Wilderern) (2013-2014, 2016)
Better Late Than Never (Besser spät als nie) (2017–present)
Car Matchmaker (Der Autovermittler) (2017–present)
Cops (2017–present)
Fast N' Loud (2012–present)
GQ TV – based on the same format as the popular men's magazine
How It's Made
Teleshopping broadcasts when DMAX is off air.
Jail (Texas Jail – Unter Arrest) (2017–present)
Lone Star Law (Lone Star Law – Die Gesetzeshüter von Texas) (2016–present)
Louis Theroux
Man vs. Wild (Born Survivor: Bear Grylls) (Abenteuer Survival) (2009–present)
Miami Ink
Monster Garage – with Jesse James
Mountain Monsters (?–present)Misfit Garage (2014-2015, 2017–present)Queen of the South (2017–present)Rick and Morty (2016–present)Storage Hunters (UK) (2017–present)Street Outlaws (2013–present)Texas Car Wars (2012–present)The Last Alaskans (Nordalaska – Überleben am Polarkreis) (2017–present)Vegas Rat Rods (Las Vegas Hot Rods) (2014–present)Wild Frank (2015–present)Yukon Men (Yukon Men – Überleben in Alaska)'' (2015–present)

Audience share

Germany

References

External links
dmax.de

 
Television channels and stations established in 2006
2006 establishments in Germany
Television stations in Germany
Television stations in Austria
Television stations in Switzerland
German-language television stations
Warner Bros. Discovery networks
Men's interest channels
Warner Bros. Discovery EMEA